Behold the Beginning is a compilation album by the heavy metal band Diamond Head. It was released after their poorly received Canterbury album and subsequent break-up and is composed mostly of tracks from the band's first album, Lightning to the Nations, as well as the non-LP single "Waited Too Long" and its B-side "Play It Loud". The album was remixed by the band's guitarist, Brian Tatler.

Behold the Beginning was re-released in 1991 by Heavy Metal Records in CD format.

Track listing

Credits 
Brian Tatler – guitar, vocals
Sean Harris – vocals
Duncan Scott – drums
Colin Kimberley – bass

References

Diamond Head (band) compilation albums
1986 compilation albums